World Association of Wrestling (WAW) is a British independent professional wrestling promotion founded by Ricky Knight, Sweet Saraya, and Jimmy Ocean in 1994 in Norwich, England. It is affiliated with the all-female promotion Bellatrix Female Warriors which is also owned by Saraya Knight. The promotion features British-style wrestling and uses British rules.

History
Ricky Knight, Sweet Saraya, and Jimmy Ocean formed WAW in 1994 in Norwich. Ocean left the business after approximately one year. In 2005, Ricky Knight and Sweet Saraya formed the World Association of Women's Wrestling, although the name was later changed to Bellatrix Female Warriors.

In 2014, WAW ran more than 100 shows. In September 2016, WAW began airing on Mustard TV. American wrestler Scott Hall was previously a backstage agent for the promotion, working behind the scenes at television tapings and appeared in an on-screen authority role as WAW Commissioner.

The promotion was featured in the 2012 Channel 4 documentary The Wrestlers: Fighting with My Family about the Knight family. It was featured in the film Fighting with My Family, which was based on the documentary.

Former Norwich City striker Grant Holt and 2012 Olympics boxing bronze medallist Anthony Ogogo both began their wrestling careers with WAW.

In 2020, WAW was featured in another documentary, this time on BBC Three. A four-part series, Step Into The Ring followed the lives of five young wrestlers battling against physical and mental health issues to pursue professional careers under the guidance of Zak Knight.

WAW Academy
The promotion also includes a wrestling school, The WAW Academy, which trains in the British catch-as-catch-can wrestling style. Trainees perform for both WAW and Bellatrix Female Warriors. The Academy trains wrestlers of all ages, including children. Interest in the school increased after Ricky Knight and Sweet Saraya's daughter Saraya-Jade was signed by the WWE in 2011. Zak Knight and Sweet Saraya are the head trainers at the academy, but they also bring in guest trainers, as well. Past guest trainers have included Scott Hall, Dave Taylor, Mr. Anderson, Steve Grey, Mal Sanders, Marty Jones, Jonny Storm, Dean Allmark, and more.

Championships

Current

Retired

See also

 Professional wrestling in the United Kingdom
 List of professional wrestling promotions in the United Kingdom

References

External links
 Official website

British professional wrestling promotions
Entertainment companies established in 1994
Entertainment companies of the United Kingdom
1994 establishments in the United Kingdom